This article is about the demographic features of the population of Angola, including population density, ethnicity, education level, health of the populace, economic status, religious affiliations and other aspects of the population.

According to 2014 census data, Angola had a population of 25,789,024 inhabitants in 2014.
Ethnically, there are three main groups, each speaking a Bantu language: the Ovimbundu who represent 37% of the population, the Ambundu with 25%, and the Bakongo 11%. Other numerically important groups include the closely interrelated Chokwe and Lunda, the Ganguela and Nyaneka-Khumbi (in both cases classification terms that stand for a variety of small groups), the Ovambo, the Herero,  the Xindonga and scattered residual groups of San. In addition, mixed race (European and African) people amount to about 30%, with (15%) population of whites, mainly ethnically Portuguese.

As a former overseas territory of Portugal until 1975, Angola possesses a Portuguese population of over 200,000, a number that has been growing from 2000 onwards, because of Angola's growing demand for qualified human resources. Currently, over 300,000 Angolans are white, 3 million Angolans are mixed race (black and white) and 50,000 Angolans are from China, which accounts for 1.35 million people. In 1974, white Angolans made up a population of 330,000 to 350,000 people in an overall population of 6.3 million Angolans at that time. The only reliable source on these numbers is Gerald Bender & Stanley Yoder, Whites in Angola on the Eve of Independence: The Politics of Numbers, Africa Today, 21 (4) 1974, pp. 23 – 37. Today, many Angolans who are not ethnic Portuguese can claim Portuguese nationality under Portuguese law. Estimates on the overall population are given in O País Besides the Portuguese, significant numbers of people from other European and from diverse Latin American countries (especially Brazil) can be found. From the 2000s, many Chinese have settled and started up small businesses, while at least as many have come as workers for large enterprises (construction or other). Observers claim that the Chinese community in Angola might include as many as 300,000 persons at the end of 2010, but reliable statistics are not at this stage available. In 1974/75, over 25,000 Cuban soldiers arrived in Angola to help the MPLA forces at the beginning of the Angolan Civil War. Once this was over, a massive development cooperation in the field of health and education brought in numerous civil personnel from Cuba. However, only a very small percentage of all these people has remained in Angola, either for personal reasons (intermarriage) or as professionals (e.g., medical doctors).

The largest religious denomination is Catholicism, to which adheres about half the population. Roughly 26% are followers of traditional forms of Protestantism (Congregationals, Methodists, Baptista, Lutherans, Reformed), but over the last decades there has in addition been a growth of Pentecostal communities and African Initiated Churches. In 2006, one out of 221 people were Jehovah's Witnesses. Blacks from Mali, Nigeria and Senegal are mostly Sunnite Muslims, but do not make up more than 1 - 2% of the population. By now few Angolans retain African traditional religions following different ethnic faiths.

Population

According to the 2022 revision of the world factbook the total population was 34,795,287 in 2022. The proportion of children below the age of 14 in 2020 was 47.83%, 49.87% was between 15 and 65 years of age, while 2.3% was 65 years or older.

Population by Sex and Age Group (Census 16.V.2014):

Population Estimates by Sex and Age Group (01.VII.2020):

Vital statistics
Registration of vital events in Angola is not complete. The website Our World in Data prepared the following estimates based on statistics from the Population Department of the United Nations.

Fertility and Births
Total Fertility Rate (TFR) (Wanted TFR) and Crude Birth Rate (CBR):

Other demographics statistics
Demographic statistics according to the World Population Review in 2022.

One birth every 23 seconds	
One death every 2 minutes	
One net migrant every 360 minutes	
Net gain of one person every 29 seconds

The following demographic statistics are from the CIA World Factbook, unless otherwise indicated.

Population
34,795,287 (2022 est.)
30,355,880 (July 2018 est.) 
29,310,273  (July 2017 est.)

Age structure

0-14 years: 47.83% (male 7,758,636 /female 7,797,869)
15-24 years: 18.64% (male 2,950,999 /female 3,109,741)
25-54 years: 27.80% (male 4,301,618 /female 4,740,463)
55-64 years: 3.43% (male 523,517 /female 591,249)
65 years and over: 2.3% (male 312,197 /female 436,050) (2020 est.)

0-14 years: 48.07% (male 7,257,155 /female 7,336,084)
15-24 years: 18.33% (male 2,701,123 /female 2,863,950)
25-54 years: 27.95% (male 4,044,944 /female 4,441,028)
55-64 years: 3.32% (male 466,085 /female 540,452)
65 years and over: 2.32% (male 296,411 /female 408,648) (2018 est.)

Total fertility rate
5.83 children born/woman (2022 est.) Country comparison to the world: 2nd
6.09 children born/woman (2018 est.) Country comparison to the world: 2nd

Birth rate
41.8 births/1,000 population (2022 est.) Country comparison to the world: 2nd
43.7 births/1,000 population (2018 est.) Country comparison to the world: 1st

Death rate
8.01 deaths/1,000 population (2022 est.) Country comparison to the world: 88th
9 deaths/1,000 population (2018 est.) Country comparison to the world: 60th

Median age
total: 15.9 years. Country comparison to the world: 225th
male: 15.4 years 
female: 16.4 years (2020 est.)

total: 15.9 years. Country comparison to the world: 224th
male: 15.4 years 
female: 16.3 years (2018 est.)

Population growth rate
3.36% (2022 est.) Country comparison to the world: 6th
3.49% (2018 est.) Country comparison to the world: 2nd

The population is growing by 3.52% annually. There are 44.2 births and 9.2 deaths per 1,000 citizens. The net migration rate is 0.2 migrants per 1,000 citizens. The fertility rate of Angola is 6.16 children born per woman as of 2017. The infant mortality rate is 67.6 deaths for every 1,000 live births with 73.3 deaths for males and 61.8 deaths for females for every 1,000 live births. Life expectancy at birth is 60.2 years; 58.2 years for males and 62.3 years for females.

Net migration rate
-0.19 migrant(s)/1,000 population (2022 est.) Country comparison to the world: 108th
0.2 migrant(s)/1,000 population (2017 est.) Country comparison to the world: 67th

Mother's mean age at first birth
19.4 years (2015/16 est.)
note: median age at first birth among women 20-49

Life expectancy at birth
total population: 62.11 years (2022 est.) Country comparison to the world: 214th
male: 60.05 years (2022 est.)
female: 64.24 years (2022 est.)

total population: 60.6 years (2018 est.) Country comparison to the world: 207th
male: 58.5 years (2018 est.)
female: 62.7 years (2018 est.)

Contraceptive prevalence rate
13.7% (2015/16)
57.1% (2012/13)

School life expectancy (primary to tertiary education)
total: 10 years (2011)
male: 13 years (2011)
female: 8 years (2011)

Sex ratio
At birth: 1.05 male(s)/female
Under 15 years: 1.02 male(s)/female
15–64 years: 1.03 male(s)/female
65 years and older: .79 male(s)/female
Total population: 1.02 male(s)/female (2011 est.)

Urbanization
urban population: 68.1% of total population (2022 est.)
4.04% annual rate of change (2020-2025 est.)

Health

According to the CIA World Factbook, 2% of adults (aged 15–49) are living with HIV/AIDS (as of 2009). The risk of contracting disease is very high. There are food and waterborne diseases, bacterial and protozoal diarrhea, hepatitis A, and typhoid fever; vectorborne diseases, malaria, African trypanosomiasis (sleeping sickness); respiratory disease: meningococcal meningitis, and schistosomiasis, a water contact disease, as of 2005.

Ethnic groups

Roughly 37% of Angolans are Ovimbundu, 25% are Ambundu, 13% are Bakongo, 2% are mestiço, 1-2% are white Africans, and people from other African ethnicities make up 22% of Angola's population.

Romani people were deported to Angola from Portugal.

Religions

Angola is a majority Christian country. Official statistics do not exist, however it is estimated that over 80% belong to a Christian church or community. More than half are Catholic, the remaining ones comprising members of traditional Protestant churches as well as of Pentecostal communities. Only 0.1% are Muslims  - generally immigrants from other African countries. Traditional indigenous religions are practiced by a very small minority, generally in peripheral rural societies.

Education

Literacy is quite low, with 71.1% of the population over the age of 15 able to read and write in Portuguese. 82% of males and 60.7% of women are literate as of 2015.

Languages

Portuguese is the official language of Angola, but Bantu and other African languages are also widely spoken. In fact, Kikongo, Kimbundu, Umbundu, Tuchokwe, Ganguela, and Ukanyama have the official status of "national languages". The mastery of Portuguese is widespread; in the cities the overwhelming majority are either fluent in Portuguese or have at least a reasonable working knowledge of this language; an increasing minority are native Portuguese speakers and have a poor, if any, knowledge of an African language.

References

Attribution:

 2003

External links

 Population cartogram of Angola

 
Society of Angola